Nicholas Mohan (born 6 October 1970) is an English former professional footballer who played as a defender making 390 league appearances for seven clubs during his 15-year Football League career.

He most notably spent time in the Premier League with both Middlesbrough and Leicester City, as well as spells in the Football League with Hull City, Bradford City, Wycombe Wanderers and Stoke City. He also played non-league football for Gateshead, Harrogate Town, Spennymoor United, Thornaby, Bishop Auckland, Stokesley and Guisborough Town.

Playing career
Born in Middlesbrough, Mohan started out as a trainee at his hometown club Middlesbrough where he spent the first seven years of his career making a total of 99 games scoring four goals. He spent a period on loan at Hull City in 1992 where he played five games.

Mohan left Teesside in 1994 to join Leicester City for £330,000. He played just one season at Filbert Street appearing in 23 games before he was one of three Leicester players, along with Ian Ormondroyd and Gavin Ward to be signed by Chris Kamara at Bradford City for £225,000. He helped City to promotion from Division Two when he was among the first City team to play at Wembley. He played 44 times for City in 1996–97 as the club avoided relegation on the final day of the season. But the arrival of new players and the return from injury of Eddie Youds forced Mohan out of the side.

He failed to appear again for City and joined Wycombe Wanderers on loan. His loan spell was deemed successful enough to join Wycombe for £85,000 in October 1997. Two years later he moved to Stoke City where he played 92 games and scoring six goals including one in the Potteries derby, before he returned to Hull City in 2001. He scored once in his second spell at the club; in a 4–0 win over York City. Whilst at Stoke he played as they won the 2000 Football League Trophy Final.

Mohan spent little more than a season back at Hull before he moved into non-league football with Gateshead. He then went on to play for Harrogate Town, Spennymoor United, Thornaby, Bishop Auckland, Stokesley, and Guisborough Town.

Career statistics
Source:

References

External links

1970 births
Living people
Footballers from Middlesbrough
English footballers
Association football defenders
Middlesbrough F.C. players
Hull City A.F.C. players
Leicester City F.C. players
Bradford City A.F.C. players
Wycombe Wanderers F.C. players
Stoke City F.C. players
Gateshead F.C. players
Harrogate Town A.F.C. players
Spennymoor United F.C. players
Thornaby F.C. players
Bishop Auckland F.C. players
Stokesley Sports Club F.C. players
Guisborough Town F.C. players
English Football League players
Premier League players
Northern Premier League players
Northern Football League players